Smolensk Strait (\'pro-tok smo-'lensk\) is the strait in the South Shetland Islands, Antarctica separating Deception Island from Rozhen Peninsula on Livingston Island, 18.4 km wide between Macaroni Point to the southwest and Barnard Point to the northeast.

The feature is so named in order to preserve the historical memory of the area.  While sailing through this strait on 6 February 1821, the Russian explorer Thaddeus von Bellingshausen met with the American sealer Nathaniel Palmer, made a description of Livingston Island and named it Smolensk after the Battle of Smolensk, one of the great battles of the Napoleonic Wars.

Location
British mapping in 1968 and Spanish in 1991.

Maps
 Islas Livingston y Decepción.  Mapa topográfico a escala 1:100000.  Madrid: Servicio Geográfico del Ejército, 1991.
 Antarctic Digital Database (ADD). Scale 1:250000 topographic map of Antarctica. Scientific Committee on Antarctic Research (SCAR). Since 1993, regularly upgraded and updated.

References
 Smolensk Strait. SCAR Composite Antarctic Gazetteer.
 Bulgarian Antarctic Gazetteer. Antarctic Place-names Commission. (details in Bulgarian, basic data in English)

External links
 Smolensk Strait. Copernix satellite image

Straits of the South Shetland Islands
Bodies of water of Livingston Island
Bulgaria and the Antarctic
Smolensk